Behrens is a surname of Germanic origin. Notable people with the surname include:

Politics/social

 Alice Behrens (1885–1952), British Girl Guide
 Betty Behrens (1904–1989), British historian
 Katja Behrens (1942–2021), German writer and translator
 Heidi Behrens-Benedict (born 1948), American politician
 Manfred Behrens (born 1956), German politician
 Rob Behrens (born 1952), UK Parliamentary and Health Service Ombudsman

Design and arts

 Peter Behrens (1868–1940), German architect 
 Paul Behrens (1893–1984), German clock maker
 Hanne Behrens (born 1950), Danish goldsmith
 Howard Behrens (born 1933), American artist

Entertainment

 Jack Behrens (born 1935), Canadian composer
 Heinz Behrens (1932-2022), German actor
 Hildegard Behrens (1937–2009), German opera singer
 Peter Behrens (musician) (1947–2016), German musician, actor and clown
 Sam Behrens (born 1950), American actor
 Howie Behrens, member of rock band Pushmonkey

Sports

 Kurt Behrens (1884–1928), German Olympic diver
 Isidor Behrens (1868–1951), Swedish sport club founder
 Herbert Behrens (born ), American tennis player
 Klaus Behrens (born 1941), German Olympic rower

Military/Science
Timothy E.J. Behrens (active 2020), British neuroscientist
 Walter Behrens (1902–1962), German chemist and statistician 
 W. W. Behrens Jr. (1922–1986), American naval officer and oceanographer

Financial
 Leffmann Behrends (–1714), Hanoverian financier
 Michael Behrens (banker) (1911–1989), British financier

See also
 1651 Behrens, an asteroid
 Behrens–Fisher problem
 Behrens (horse) (1994–2014), American thoroughbred racehorse
 Berens (disambiguation)

References

Surnames from given names